Paul Norton may refer to:

Paul Norton (artist) (1909–1984), American artist
Paul Norton (musician) (born 1961), Australian singer-songwriter best known for "Stuck on You"
Paul Norton (rugby league), British rugby league player in the 1970s and 1980s
Paul Norton (rugby league, Lancashire), rugby league prop in the 1990s and 2000s for Lancashire, Lancashire Lynx, and Oldham

See also